The Roman Catholic Archdiocese of Los Altos Quetzaltenango-Totonicapán  is a Latin Metropolitan Archdiocese in Guatemala.
 
The archiepiscopal seat is Quetzaltenango Cathedral, originally built in Quetzaltenango in 1535. It also has a co-cathedral, San Miguel Arcángel, in the city of Totonicapán.
 
It was vacant until named Mario Alberto Molina Palma on July 14, 2011; having been headed until Monday, October 4, 2010, by Archbishop Oscar Julio Vian Morales, who was then named by Pope Benedict XVI to succeed Cardinal Quezada as Metropolitan Archbishop of Guatemala.

History 
It was erected on 27 July 1921 as the Diocese of Quetzaltenango, Los Altos, on territory split off from the Metropolitan Roman Catholic Archdiocese of Guatemala.

It lost territory on 10 March 1951 to establish the Diocese of San Marcos and the Diocese of Sololá-Chimaltenango, both becoming its suffragans.

It was elevated and renamed to Archdiocese of Los Altos Quetzaltenango-Totonicapán on 13 February 1996.
It lost more territory on 31 December 1996 to establish the Diocese of Suchitepéquez-Retalhuleu, another suffragan.

Province 
It ecclesiastical province comprises the Metropolitan's own Archdiocese and the following suffragan dioceses :
 Roman Catholic Diocese of Huehuetenango
 Roman Catholic Diocese of Quiché
 Roman Catholic Diocese of San Marcos
 Roman Catholic Diocese of Sololá-Chimaltenango 
 Roman Catholic Diocese of Suchitepéquez-Retalhuleu.

Extent 
The Archdiocese covers the departments of Quetzaltenango and Totonicapán. It has 28 parishes, 29 diocesan priests, 24 religious priests, 57 friars and 118 nuns.

Bishops
(all Roman Rite)

Episcopal ordinaries
 Suffragan Bishops of Quetzaltenango, Los Altos
 Jorge García Caballeros (1928.06.30 – 1955.04.05), also Apostolic Administrator of Sololá (Guatemala) (1951.03.10 – 1955.04.05) and Apostolic Administrator of San Marcos (Guatemala) (1951.03.10 – 1955.04.05)
 Luis Manresa Formosa, Jesuits (S.J.) (1955.11.30 – 1979.05.30), also President of Episcopal Secretariat of Central America and Panama (1971–1972) and Second Vice-President of Latin American Episcopal Council (1972–1979)
 Oscar Garcia Urizar (1980.03.04 – 1987.01.08)
 Victor Hugo Martínez Contreras (1987.04.04 – 1996.02.13 see below), previously Titular Bishop of Naissus (1970.11.30 – 1975.09.20), Auxiliary Bishop of Huehuetenango (Guatemala) (1970.11.30 – 1975.09.20), promoted Bishop of Huehuetenango (1975.09.20 – 1987.04.04), President of Episcopal Conference of Guatemala (1986–1988)

 Metropolitan Archbishops of Los Altos, Quetzaltenango–Totonicapán
Victor Hugo Martínez Contreras (see above 1996.02.13 – 2007.04.19), also President of Episcopal Conference of Guatemala (1998–2002)
Oscar Julio Vian Morales, Salesians (S.D.B.) (2007.04.19 – 2010.10.02), previously Titular Bishop of Pupiana (1996.11.30 – 2007.04.19) & Apostolic Vicar of El Petén (Guatemala) (1996.11.30 – 2007.04.19); later Metropolitan Archbishop of Guatemala (Guatemala) (2010.10.02 – 2013.04.25), restyled Metropolitan Archbishop of Santiago de Guatemala (2013.04.25 – 2018.02.24)
Apostolic administrator Gonzalo de Villa y Vásquez, S.J. (2010.10 – 2011.07.14), while Bishop of suffragan see Sololá–Chimaltenango (Guatemala) (2007.07.28 – ...)
 Mario Alberto Molina Palma, O.A.R. (2011.07.14 – ...), previously), also Vice-President of Episcopal Conference of Guatemala (2012.03 – ...); previously Bishop of Quiché (Guatemala) (2004.10.29 – 2011.07.14)

Auxiliary bishops
Rafael González Estrada (1944-1955), appointed Auxiliary Bishop of Guatemala
Gerardo Humberto Flores Reyes (1966-1969), appointed Bishop of Verapaz, Cobán

References

Sources and external links 
 GigaCatolic, with incumbent biography links

Roman Catholic dioceses in Guatemala
Christian organizations established in 1921
Roman Catholic dioceses and prelatures established in the 20th century
1921 establishments in Guatemala
Quetzaltenango
Roman Catholic Ecclesiastical Province of Los Altos Quetzaltenango-Totonicapán